State Route 257 (SR 257) is a  route serving as a connection between SR 195 at Jasper to Duncan Bridge in Walker County. Once entering Winston County the route becomes Winston County Road 41 (CR 41). The road is also signed as the Curry Highway.

Route description
The southern terminus of SR 257 is at its intersection with SR 195 northeast of Jasper. From this point, the route takes a northeasterly course as two-lane undivided Curry Highway, passing through wooded areas with some homes. The road leaves Jasper and continues through forested areas with some fields and residences. The route curves north and passes through the community of Curry, where it intersects CR 43. From Curry, SR 257 travels in a northerly direction through more rural areas before curving northwest and coming to its northern terminus at the Winston County line. At this point, the road continues into Winston County as CR 41.

Major intersections

References

257
Transportation in Walker County, Alabama